

The Lewis and Elizabeth Van Vleet House, also known as the Yee House, is a historic building located in the Eliot neighborhood of Portland, Oregon, United States, on the plat of the former town of Albina. Built in 1894, it was the home of Lewis Van Vleet (1826–1910), the United States Deputy Surveyor for the Pacific Northwest for 40 years, among other accomplishments. Starting in 1956, it was the home of Rozelle Jackson Yee (1913–2000), a leader in the African American community who was active in promoting neighborhood involvement in the redevelopment projects that vastly altered the Albina area in the latter half of the 20th century. The house is architecturally important as a high expression of the Queen Anne style with extensive stained glass windows from the prominent Povey Brothers Studio. It is one of relatively few vintage houses in Albina to survive the period of redevelopment projects.

The house was entered on the National Register of Historic Places in 2001.

Notes

See also
National Register of Historic Places listings in Northeast Portland, Oregon

References

External links

Oregon Historic Sites Database entry
, National Register of Historic Places cover documentation

Houses completed in 1894
1894 establishments in Oregon
Queen Anne architecture in Oregon
Houses on the National Register of Historic Places in Portland, Oregon
Eliot, Portland, Oregon
African-American history in Portland, Oregon